EGP may refer to:

Organizations
 Edinburgh Global Partnerships, a student-run charity
 Guerrilla Army of the Poor, in Guatemala
 European Green Party, a political party

Technology 
 Experimental Geodetic Payload, Japanese satellite
 Exploration Gateway Platform, 2012 Boeing-NASA discussion for a space station
 Exterior gateway protocol, a class of routing protocols used between Autonomous Systems
 Exterior Gateway Protocol, a specific protocol formerly used on the Internet

Other uses 
 Eagle Pass Municipal Airport
 Eastern Gas Pipeline, in Australia
 Egyptian pound, the currency of Egypt
 Enel Green Power, an Italian energy company
 Engineered Glass Products, an American manufacturing company